Slovakia competed at the 2000 Summer Paralympics in Sydney, Australia. 46 competitors from Slovakia won 13 medals including 3 gold, 5 silver and 5 bronze to finish 36th in the medal table.

Medal table

See also 
 Slovakia at the Paralympics
 Slovakia at the 2000 Summer Olympics

References 

Slovakia at the Paralympics
Nations at the 2000 Summer Paralympics